Cleinias, father of Alcibiades, brother of Axiochus, and member of the Alcmaeonidae family, was an Athenian who married Deinomache, the daughter of Megacles, and became the father of the famous Alcibiades. Plutarch tells us that he traced his family line back to Eurysaces, the son of Telamonian Ajax. Cleinias died at the Battle of Coronea in 447 BC.

He is also credited with the Cleinias Decree, which involved the tightening up of the process of tribute collection in the Athenian Empire. Attributing this inscription to this particular Cleinias, the father of Alcibiades, places the decree in the early 440s, usually given as 447, as Cleinias died at the Battle of Coronea in 447 BC. Although more recently, scholars have argued the Cleinias Decree was made in the 420s following Athens running low on money. Thus we cannot be certain this is the same Cleinias.

References

447 BC deaths
5th-century BC Athenians
Ancient Greek rulers
Ancient Greeks killed in battle
Alcmaeonidae
Year of birth unknown